Brithysternus is a genus of beetles in the family Carabidae, containing the following species:

 Brithysternus calcaratum MacLeay, 1873
 Brithysternus macleayi Sloane, 1910
 Brithysternus nodosum Sloane, 1910

References

Broscinae